"All I Ever Wanted" is a song by Swedish musician Basshunter. It is similar to his previous single "Now You're Gone" in that it is an English remake using music based on a previous Basshunter track, without any lyrical connection. The melody for "All I Ever Wanted" is largely a remixed version of "Daddy DJ", as is Basshunter's earlier song "Vi sitter i Ventrilo och spelar DotA".

"All I Ever Wanted" uses the melody from the song "Daddy DJ", created by the French dance act of the same name.

Composition
"All I Ever Wanted" is a beat-driven, heavily-vocodered track.

Music video
The video clip was recorded in Fuengirola, Málaga, Spain, featuring Aylar Lie and Lucas Thorheim.

Chart performance
On 6 July 2008, the song entered the UK Singles Chart at number three, climbing to number two the following week. It had a long and successful chart run in the UK and a year and a half after its release it re-entered the UK top 100 at number 98 due to Basshunter being a contestant on Celebrity Big Brother 7 and it often being played on the spin-off shows.

In New Zealand, the song debuted at number 27 and peaked at number seventeen. It was certified gold after 18 weeks, selling over 7,500 copies.

Adaptations
Jón Bjarni sang "All I Ever Wanted" at the vocational competition for upper secondary school careers in Verkmenntaskólinn á Akureyri.

Track listing

UK single
 "All I Ever Wanted" (Radio Edit) - 2:59
 "All I Ever Wanted" (Extended Mix) - 5:25
 "All I Ever Wanted" (Fonzerelli Remix) - 6:39
 "Now You're Gone" (Voodoo & Serano Remix) (featuring DJ Mental Theo's Bazzheadz) - 5:39

Charts

Weekly charts

Year-end charts

Certifications

See also
 List of number-one singles of 2008 (Ireland)
 List of UK top-ten singles in 2008

References

External links
 

2008 singles
Basshunter songs
Irish Singles Chart number-one singles
2008 songs
Number-one singles in Scotland
Songs written by David Le Roy
Songs written by Jean Christophe Belval
Songs written by Scott Simons
Songs about loneliness
Song recordings produced by Basshunter